Ronald Philip Lurie (January 23, 1941 – December 22, 2020) was an American businessman and politician. He was the mayor of Las Vegas, Nevada from 1987 to 1991. Lurie was a member of the Democratic Party.

Life and career
Lurie worked for International Game Technology, helped develop the Lied Discovery Museum and the Las Vegas Natural History Museum, and also assisted in the development of the CAT Transit System.

Prior to being mayor, Lurie served on the city council for 14 years. After completing his term as mayor, Lurie went on to several positions at Arizona Charlie's Decatur. Lurie was Jewish.

Death
Lurie had blood cancer and other health issues. In late 2020, he contracted COVID-19 during the COVID-19 pandemic in Nevada, and died shortly after in hospice. He was 79 years old, one month and one day short from his 80th birthday.

References

External links

1941 births
2020 deaths
20th-century American politicians
Businesspeople from Las Vegas
Jewish mayors of places in the United States
Las Vegas City Council members
Mayors of Las Vegas
Nevada Democrats
Politicians from Los Angeles
Deaths from the COVID-19 pandemic in Nevada